Marcos Alexandro de Carvalho Pereira is a retired Brazilian football player.

Pereira had a short stint playing for Mohun Bagan A.C. in the I-League in India as a midfielder. Before that, he played club football in Punjab for JCT FC. He was the Football coach of the Techno India Group Public School, Hooghly Chinsurah for 2 years (2016-17) and resumed coaching in July 2019.

References

External links
 http://goal.com/en-india/people/brazil/25733/marcos-pereira

Brazilian footballers
Association football midfielders
1973 births
Living people
Mohun Bagan AC players
JCT FC players